WQRV (100.3 FM) is an adult hits-formatted radio station serving the Huntsville, Alabama, market, which includes counties in northern Alabama and southern central Tennessee. Owned and operated by San Antoniobased iHeartMedia, the station's studios are located in Madison, Alabama, and its transmitter is located north of Huntsville.

History
This station had been WVNA-FM since 1962 before becoming country music formatted WLAY-FM on March 30, 2000. This lasted until a 2006 change to match a format and positioning change to "The River."  The station was assigned the WQRV call letters by the Federal Communications Commission on March 10, 2006.

WQRV began in April 2006 as a format relocated from the former WWXQ 92.5 and WXQW 94.1 MHz frequencies, which iHeartMedia (then known as Clear Channel Communications) had sold to Cumulus Media. Those stations were known collectively as "WXQ." The station frequency was transferred from Florence, Alabama, to the Huntsville market, with the city of license being Meridianville, Alabama, north of Huntsville.

The station originally broadcast a more rock-based classic hits format under The River branding; eventually, by the late 2000s, it had shifted to pop-based classic hits of the 1960s, 1970s, and 1980s, while still mixing in rock hits. The station currently is considered as an Adult Hits station, which contains a strong 1970s and 1980s generic standard classic hits format, with some 1990s, 2000s, and a few 2010s being added to the playlist.

Rick and Bubba, a popular syndicated Southern-culture morning show, relocated to WQRV from crosstown rival WRTT-FM on January 2, 2008.

HD Radio 
On November 9, 2012, WQRV-HD2 dropped it's simulcast of sister station WBHP and began stunting with Christmas music for the holidays as "Christmas 106.5" (simulcast on translator W293AH). On December 26, WQRV-HD2 flipped to Top 40/CHR as "106.5 KISS FM", launching with 10,065 songs in a row played commercial-free. The first song on "106.5 KISS FM" was "Die Young" by Kesha.

On September 13, 2018, after briefly stunting with baseball-related music as "Trash Pandas Radio", WQRV-HD3 launched an alternative rock format as Alt 92.9. It is carried on translator station W225AH.
On April 7, 2022, W225AH signed off and WQRV-HD3 rebranded as "ALT HSV".

References

External links

QRV
Adult hits radio stations in the United States
IHeartMedia radio stations
Radio stations established in 1962
1962 establishments in Alabama